During the 1919–20 season Hibernian, a football club based in Edinburgh, finished eighteenth out of 22 clubs in the Scottish Football League.

Scottish Football League

Final League table

Scottish Cup

See also
List of Hibernian F.C. seasons

References

External links
Hibernian 1919/1920 results and fixtures, Soccerbase

Hibernian F.C. seasons
Hibernian